IAYC may refer to:

I am your child, parents group (now called Parents for Children)
I Am Your Conscience, band
"I Am Your Conscience", song by Leæther Strip, a Danish musical project
"I Am Your Conscience", song by Cherryholmes, an American bluegrass band
International Association of Yiddish Clubs
International Astronomical Youth Camp, an annual summer camp for young people